The celebrated composer Joseph Haydn died in Vienna, aged 77, on May 31, 1809, after a long illness. As Austria was at war and Vienna occupied by Napoleon's troops, a rather simple funeral was held in Gumpendorf, the parish in Vienna to which Haydn's house on the Windmühle belonged, followed by burial in the Hundsturm cemetery. Following the burial, two men conspired to bribe the gravedigger and thereby sever and steal the dead composer's head. These were Joseph Carl Rosenbaum, a former secretary of the Esterházy family (Haydn's employers), and Johann Nepomuk Peter, governor of the provincial prison of Lower Austria. Rosenbaum was well known to Haydn, who during his lifetime had intervened with the Esterházys in an attempt to make possible Rosenbaum's marriage to the soprano Therese Gassmann.

Peter and Rosenbaum's motivation was an interest in phrenology, a now-discredited scientific movement that attempted to associate mental capacities with aspects of cranial anatomy; Peter and Rosenbaum were acquainted with and admired the work of Franz Joseph Gall, a leading phrenologist. Of particular interest to phrenology was the anatomy of individuals held to have exhibited great genius during their lifetime. (Eighteen years later, a similar attempt was made on the body of Ludwig van Beethoven, possibly for similar reasons.)

The head was stolen by the gravedigger (whose name was Jakob Demuth) only on June 4, and due to hot weather the head had decomposed considerably, causing Rosenbaum to throw up as he delivered it in a carriage to the hospital for dissection. According to Landon, "after an examination of an hour the head was macerated and the skull bleached." Peter concluded that "the bump of music" in Haydn's skull was indeed "fully developed". In September, the skull was installed in Peter's collection at his home, where it could be shown to visitors. Peter kept it in a handsome custom-made black wooden box, with a symbolic golden lyre at the top, glass windows, and a white cushion. At some point in the ensuing decade, Peter gave up his skull collection and let Rosenbaum have, among others, the Haydn skull.

In 1820, Haydn's old patron Prince Nikolaus Esterházy II was inadvertently reminded by the chance remark of an acquaintance that he had forgotten to carry through his plan of having Haydn's remains transferred from Gumpendorf to the family seat in Eisenstadt. When the remains were exhumed, the Prince was furious to find that they included no skull, and quickly deduced that Peter and Rosenbaum were responsible. However, through a series of devious maneuvers Peter and Rosenbaum managed to maintain possession of the skull. Rosenbaum hid the skull in a straw mattress. During the search of Rosenbaum's house, his wife Therese lay on the bed and claimed to be menstruating—with the result that the searchers did not go near the mattress. Eventually Rosenbaum gave Prince Esterházy a different skull.

After Rosenbaum's death in 1829 the skull passed from hand to hand. Rosenbaum had willed the skull to Peter, who gave it to his physician Karl Heller, from whom it went to a Professor Rokitansky, who in 1895 gave it to the Vienna Gesellschaft der Musikfreunde (Society of the Friends of Music). The musicologist Karl Geiringer, who worked at the Society before the advent of Hitler, would on occasion proudly bring out the relic and show it to visitors.

In 1932, Prince Paul Esterházy, Nikolaus's descendant, built a marble tomb for Haydn in the Bergkirche in Eisenstadt. This was a suitable location, since it is where some of the masses Haydn wrote for the Esterházy family were premiered. The Prince's express purpose was to unify the composer's remains. However, there were many further delays, and it was only in 1954 that the skull could be transferred, in a splendid ceremony, from the Gesellschaft der Musikfreunde to this tomb, thus completing the 145-year-long burial process. When the composer's skull was finally restored to the remainder of his skeleton, the substitute skull was not removed. Thus Haydn's tomb now contains two skulls.

Notes

Bibliography

Further reading

Individual human heads, skulls and brains
Body parts of individual people
Joseph Haydn
Phrenology